The 2017 Italian Basketball Cup, knows as the PosteMobile Final Eight for sponsorship reasons, was the 49th edition of Italy's national cup tournament. The competition is organised by Lega Basket for LBA clubs. The tournament was played from 16 to 19 February 2017 in Rimini.

EA7 Emporio Armani Milano were the defending champions.

EA7 Emporio Armani Milano went to win his 6th Cup by beating Banco di Sardegna Sassari 84–74 in the Finals. Ricky Hickman was named Finals MVP of the competition.

Qualification
Qualified for the tournament were selected based on their position on the LBA table at the end of the first half of the season.

Bracket

Quarterfinals

Grissin Bon Reggio Emilia vs. Betaland Capo d'Orlando

EA7 Emporio Armani Milano vs. Enel Brindisi

Sidigas Avellino vs. Banco di Sardegna Sassari

Umana Reyer Venezia vs. Germani Basket Brescia

Semifinals
EA7 Emporio Armani Milan rallied to beat Grissin Bon Reggio Emilia 84-87 and reach Italian Cup finals. Rakim Sanders led the way with 22 points and 5 steals, while Davide Pascolo scored 9 of his 14 points in the fourth quarter for Milan. Pietro Aradori was Reggio Emilia’s top scorer with 14 points. Reggio Emilia had 8 different scorers in the first quarter, and finished it with a 14-4 run, capped with an Aradori triple that made it 26-18. Reggio Emilia extended it to 38-28 in the second, but Sanders scored 11 points in the second stanza to help Milan get back and tie the game at 45-45 at halftime. Teams traded leads in the third, and Aradori’s basket got Reggio Emilia in front at the end of the third quarter, 64-59. Davide Pascolo kept Milan in touch in the fourth, before Zoran Dragic, Andrea Cinciarini and Milan Macvan hit back-to-back threes to make it 81-87, and Milan held on for victory. In Sunday’s final, Milan will play Banco di Sardegna Sassari which downed Germani Basket Brescia 77-70. Trevor Lacey had 15 points plus 8 rebounds, and Rok Stipcevic scored 13 points in victory.

EA7 Emporio Armani Milano vs. Grissin Bon Reggio Emilia

Banco di Sardegna Sassari vs. Germani Basket Brescia

Final
EA7 Emporio Armani Milano successfully defended the Italian Cup with an 84-74 come-from-behind win over Banco di Sardegna Sassari in the final on Sunday. Ricky Hickman made 5 of 7 shots from downtown en route to 25 points, Rakim Sanders scored 15 points and Milan Macvan added 11 for the winners. Sassari took charge from the start with a 2-13 run and led 11-19 after 10 minutes. A Josh Carter triple made it 15-25 midway through the second quarter, but Sanders heated up as Milan fought back and Hickman’s triple to end the half drew Milan within 34-36. A three by Sanders to open the second half gave Milan its first lead. Hickman netted another three and Davide Pascolo converted a three-point play to boost the margin to 46-40. Andrea Cinciarini further extended the margin to 9 before strong play by Gani Lawal sparked a Sassari comeback. A David Bell jumper made it 56-54 through three quarters. It was still a 2-point game four minutes into the fourth quarter when Hickman and Macvan combined for all Milan’s points in an 11-2 march to take a 75-64 advantage with 3:38 remaining. Sassari raced back with 8 straight points, but was held to a single basket over the final two minutes as Milan closed out the game from the line. Trevor Lacey paced Sassari with 15 points, Lawal scored 13 and Rok Stipcevic 11.

EA7 Emporio Armani Milano vs. Banco di Sardegna Sassari

Sponsors

Source:

References

External links

Italian Basketball Cup
2016–17 in Italian basketball